Horace is a city in Cass County, North Dakota, United States. As of the 2020 census, the population was 3,085.

The city is a suburb of the Fargo-Moorhead metropolitan area. It is the sixteenth-largest city in North Dakota. Horace was founded in 1882 at a time of widespread European-American settlement in the territory.

History
A post office has been in operation at Horace since 1875. The city is named after Horace Greeley of Chappaqua, New York, editor of the New York Tribune. Greeley encouraged western settlement with the motto "Go West, young man".

The city is bordered on the west by the Sheyenne River, a tributary of the Red River. To reduce damage from seasonal flooding, which sometimes was severe, the state and federal government collaborated on the Sheyenne Diversion Project, constructing a canal and associated support in 1990–1992 to move Sheyenne flood waters to the west and south of Horace, and north past the western side of West Fargo. This has proved its worth, protecting the Sheyenne cities from damage that resulted from the large 1997 Red River flood, which destroyed areas of Grand Forks and East Grand Forks to the north.

Geography

Horace is located at  (46.759795, −96.904122).

Demographics

2010 census
As of the census of 2010, there were 2,430 people, 810 households, and 682 families living in the city. The racial makeup of the city was 97.1% White, 0.5% African American, 1.4% Native American, 0.2% Asian, 0.2% from other races, and 0.7% from two or more races. Hispanic or Latino of any race were 0.9% of the population.

There were 810 households, of which 50.1% had children under the age of 18 living with them, 74.4% were married couples living together, 4.4% had a female householder with no husband present, 5.3% had a male householder with no wife present, and 15.8% were non-families. 12.3% of all households were made up of individuals, and 1.4% had someone living alone who was 65 years of age or older. The average household size was 3.00 and the average family size was 3.27.

The median age in the city was 35.6 years. 33.4% of residents were under the age of 18; 5.1% were between the ages of 18 and 24; 29.6% were from 25 to 44; 26.9% were from 45 to 64; and 4.9% were 65 years of age or older. The gender makeup of the city was 50.6% male and 49.4% female.

2000 census
As of the census of 2000, there were 915 people, 300 households, and 248 families living in the city. The population density was 408.7 people per square mile (157.7/km2). There were 311 housing units at an average density of 138.9 per square mile (53.6/km2). The racial makeup of the city was 98.47% White, 0.11% African American, 0.55% Native American, 0.22% Asian, 0.33% from other races, and 0.33% from two or more races. Hispanic or Latino of any race were 0.33% of the population.

There were 300 households, out of which 55.7% had children under the age of 18 living with them, 68.3% were married couples living together, 10.0% had a female householder with no husband present, and 17.3% were non-families. 11.3% of all households were made up of individuals, and 2.7% had someone living alone who was 65 years of age or older. The average household size was 3.05 and the average family size was 3.29.

In the city, the population was spread out, with 35.7% under the age of 18, 7.0% from 18 to 24, 37.5% from 25 to 44, 15.6% from 45 to 64, and 4.2% who were 65 years of age or older. The median age was 30 years. For every 100 females, there were 92.6 males. For every 100 females age 18 and over, there were 98.0 males.

The median income for a household in the city was $46,510, and the median income for a family was $47,639. Males had a median income of $31,875 versus $20,924 for females. The per capita income for the city was $15,761. About 3.2% of families and 3.9% of the population were below the poverty line, including 3.6% of those under age 18 and 9.5% of those age 65 or over.

References

Cities in Cass County, North Dakota
Cities in North Dakota
Populated places established in 1882